The 1968 San Diego State Aztecs football team represented San Diego State College during the 1968 NCAA College Division football season.

This was San Diego State's last year in the College Division of the NCAA. They had been a member of the California Collegiate Athletic Association (CCAA) for the previous 29 years, but competed as an Independent during the 1968 season. The team was led by head coach Don Coryell, in his eighth year, and played their home games at San Diego Stadium in San Diego, California.

They finished the season undefeated for the second time under Coach Coryell, with nine wins, zero losses, and one tie (9–0–1). At the end of the season, the Aztecs were voted the College Division national champion for the third consecutive year in the UPI Small College Football Poll and No. 2 in the AP Small College Football Poll.

Schedule

Roster

Team players in the NFL/AFL
The following San Diego State players were selected in the 1969 NFL Draft.

The following finished their college career in 1968, were not drafted, but played in the NFL.

Team awards

Notes

References

San Diego State
San Diego State Aztecs football seasons
NCAA Small College Football Champions
College football undefeated seasons
San Diego State Aztecs football